Ferdinando Smerghetto (26 November 1927 – 18 December 1993) was an Italian rower. He competed in the men's eight event at the 1952 Summer Olympics.

References

External links
 

1927 births
1993 deaths
Italian male rowers
Olympic rowers of Italy
Rowers at the 1952 Summer Olympics
Place of birth missing